Tradescantia reverchonii, commonly called Reverchon's spiderwort, is a species of plant in the dayflower family that is native to central and eastern Texas, western Louisiana and southwestern Arkansas in the United States.

It is a perennial that produces purple or blue flowers in the spring on herbaceous stems.

References

Tradescantia
Flora of the Southeastern United States
Flora without expected TNC conservation status